Bengies Drive-In is a drive-in theater in Middle River, Maryland, a suburb of Baltimore, with the largest movie screen remaining in the United States.

History
Bengies was opened on June 6, 1956 by Frog Mortar Corporation. It was designed by Jack K. Vogel as one of three drive-ins in the Vogel Theatre chain, and is still owned by the Vogel family, and  showed entirely double features, with triple features on weekends .

During the 2020 COVID-19 pandemic, it was one of many drive-ins in the US used for socially distanced movie viewing and other events, and kept open after the summer ended; the theater rented in-car heaters to patrons.

Screen

References

Further reading

External links

Buildings and structures in Baltimore County, Maryland
1956 establishments in Maryland
Drive-in theaters in the United States